Eagle Wings also known as Eagle Wings: an Air Force Story is a 2021 Nigerian war action drama film directed by Paul Apel Papel. It is taunted as Nigeria's first military based film. The film production also historically marked the first instance of a major collaboration between the Nigerian military and Nollywood film industry. The film plot is based on the struggles, dedication and sacrifices of the Nigerian Airforce soldiers and their fight against the insurgency in the Northern part of Nigeria. The film had its theatrical release on 12 March 2021 and opened to mixed reviews from critics.

Cast 

 Enyinna Nwigwe as Nuru
 Femi Jacobs
 Yakubu Muhammed
 Uzee Usman
 Funky Mallam
 Patience Ujah
 Sadiq Daba as President of Nigeria
 Francis Duru
 Iyke Odiase
 Nazareth Jesse
 Sidney Idiala
 Stephanie Apel

Production 
Paul Apel Papel announced the directorial venture and also helmed as a producer of the film under his production banner Papel Productions. Nigerian Air Force also came on board as co-producers of the film project thus making it as the first collaboration between Nigerian Film Corporation and Nigerian Air Force Investments Limited. As per reports; it was during November 2019 that Nigerian military reportedly collaborated with the Nigerian Film Corporation to produce a military film. The film story was made based on real life stories of the Nigerian military personnel and it was officially confirmed by the Nigerian Ministry of Defence in Twitter.

The principal photography of the Eagle Wings began on 25 February 2020 which is also the Birthday of the Producer/Director Paul Apel Papel in the state of Kaduna. The filming proceeded on full swing starting from February 2020 until April 2020. The filming was also partly disrupted due to the COVID-19 pandemic but the production continued with the support of the Nigerian military. The Nigerian Airforce was reported to have provided the necessary voluntary financial assistance, equipment and logistics to facilitate the smooth production of the film. The film was shot using real aircraft and weapons of the Nigerian Air Force.

The film was predominantly set at the air force base facilities in Kaduna, Maiduguri and Abuja. It was also revealed that the Nigerian Airforce provided training to the cast members of the film.

High quality cameras and warfare devices were used for the film and it became the first Nigerian film to utilise major warfare equipment. It also became the first Nollywood film ever to be shot using the Atlaslenses Orion 2x anamorphic lenses on the Arri Alexa mini cameras. In fact, the motion picture segments were shot on Arri film camera with the Open Gate format at 4444XQ codec using the anamorphic lenses.

The post-production work was completed at the Papel Image Tech media outfit in Abuja. The film also marked the posthumous release of Sadiq Daba who was roped into play the role as the President of Nigeria.

Release 
The film was premiered in Abuja exactly one year after on the 25 February 2021 and it was premiered in Lagos on 7 March 2021 prior to the nationwide theatrical release on 12 March 2021.

Awards and nominations

References

External links 

 

English-language Nigerian films
Nigerian action drama films
2021 action drama films
Films set in Abuja
War films based on actual events
Nigerian films based on actual events